Say It in French is a 1938 American comedy film directed by Andrew L. Stone and written by Frederick J. Jackson. The film stars Ray Milland, Olympe Bradna, Irene Hervey, Janet Beecher, Mary Carlisle and Holmes Herbert. The film was released on November 28, 1938, by Paramount Pictures.

Plot
A family with financial problems arranges a wedding between their pro golfer son and a wealthy heiress, however they don't know that the son already got married while playing a tournament in France.

Cast 
Ray Milland as Richard Carrington, Jr.
Olympe Bradna as Julie
Irene Hervey as Auriol Marsden 
Janet Beecher as Mrs. Carrington
Mary Carlisle as Phyllis Carrington
Holmes Herbert as Richard Carrington Sr.
Walter Kingsford as Hopkins
William Collier, Sr. as Howland
Erik Rhodes as Irving
Mona Barrie as Lady Westover
G. P. Huntley as Lord Westover
Gertrude Sutton as Daisy
Forbes Murray as Dr. Van Gulden

References

External links 
 

1938 films
Paramount Pictures films
American comedy films
1938 comedy films
Films based on works by Jacques Deval
American films based on plays
Films directed by Andrew L. Stone
American black-and-white films
1930s English-language films
1930s American films